Mount Barbaro or Mount Gauro in Italy  or , is one of the eruptive vents of the Phlegraean Fields, a volcanic field  of Italy located in Campania.

Geography 
Mount Barbaro is a tuff cone containing zeolite. Its structure consists of layers of ash either parallel or overlapping them, including lenticular masses of pumice agglomerated. The tuff cone was built on unknown and covered by a paleosol represented mainly by deposits of the Archiaverno, another tuff cone located to the west.

The crater, oval, is fused to another unnamed crater west.

History 
The date of the volcanic eruption that formed the Mount Barbaro is unknown but it was manifested by phreatomagmatic eruption.

The Battle of Mount Gaurus was fought in 342 BC at the foot of the mountain during  First Samnite War. The ancient Romans, led by Marcus Valerius Corvus, defeated the Samnites.

References

Campanian volcanic arc
Geography of Naples
Mountains of Campania
Volcanoes of Italy
Phlegraean Fields